Abiansemal is a village (desa) and capital of Abiansemal District in the Badung Regency of Bali, Indonesia. As of 2016, the population was estimated at 7,215.

References

Populated places in Bali
Badung Regency